Dindéfelo (var. Dinndéfélou) is a village near Segou in southeast Senegal. It is home to the tourist attraction and park at Dindefelo Falls which can be reached by following a creek-side trail to the south.  The town is 38 km southeast of Kedougou, 6 km from the town of Segou Senegal, and was historically a part of Kedougou kingdom in the Senegalese foothills of the Fouta Djallon mountains.   The region is traditionally home to the Bassari people.

References

Populated places in Kédougou Region